Uruguay sent a team of 20 athletes to compete in the 2013 Summer Universiade held in Kazan, Russia from July 6 to July 17, 2013.

Football

Uruguay has qualified a men's team in the football competition.

Each nation must submit a squad of 20 players, with a minimum of two goalkeepers. The following is the Uruguay squad in the men's football tournament of the 2013 Summer Universiade:

Coach:  Gustavo Israel

|-----
! colspan="9" bgcolor="#B0D3FB" align="left" |
|----- bgcolor="#DFEDFD"

|-----
! colspan="9" bgcolor="#B0D3FB" align="left" |
|----- bgcolor="#DFEDFD"

|-----
! colspan="9" bgcolor="#B0D3FB" align="left" |
|----- bgcolor="#DFEDFD"

Swimming

References

2013 in Uruguayan sport
Nations at the 2013 Summer Universiade
2013